Lisa Maria Singh (born 20 February 1972) is a former Australian politician. She was a Senator for Tasmania from 2011 to 2019. She had previously been a member of the Tasmanian House of Assembly, representing the division of Denison from 2006 to 2010. The granddaughter of an Indo-Fijian member of the Parliament of Fiji, Singh was Australia's first female federal parliamentarian of Indian origin.

After leaving politics she worked as Head of Government Advocacy for Walk Free, an international human rights organisation and initiative of the Minderoo Foundation. She is currently the Director and CEO of the Australia India Institute, the University of Melbourne’s centre dedicated to promoting support for and understanding of the bilateral relationship. She is also the Deputy Chair of the Australia India Council. She sits on the advisory councils of Asialink and the Australian Human Rights Institute.

Early life and family
Singh was born in 1972, in Hobart, Tasmania, to a Fijian-Indian father and an English-Australian mother. Her father arrived in Australia as an international student in 1963. She attended St Mary's College, Elizabeth College, and the University of Tasmania, graduating with a Bachelor of Arts with Honours in Social Geography. She completed a Master of International Relations from Sydney's Macquarie University.

Singh is the granddaughter of Ram Jati Singh OBE, who was a member of the Fijian Legislative Council (the precursor of the present day Fijian Parliament) in the 1960s. Her uncle, Raman Pratap Singh, was a Fijian politician and a past President of the National Federation Party and was a Member of Parliament from 1994 to 1999. He made an unsuccessful attempt to regain his seat in 2014.

Singh's great-grandparents migrated from India to Fiji under the British Indian indenture system around the turn of the century.

In her maiden speech in the Senate, Singh described her ancestral connection to India through her great-grandfather's "Rajput warrior roots".

Early career
Singh worked in public relations and for the Australian Education Union as an industrial organiser. .

From 1999 to 2001, Singh was an adviser to Senator Sue Mackay. Singh then became the Director of the Tasmanian Working Women's Centre, where she campaigned for paid parental leave and equal pay. She was a member of Emily's List, and served on its National Executive in Australia. 

Singh became Hobart Citizen of the Year in 2004 for her work in the peace movement at the time of the Iraq war, especially in highlighting the plight of women and children in war.

Singh has also served as the President of the YWCA Tasmania, the President of the United Nations Association Tasmania and as a member of the Tasmania Women's Council. She was convenor of the Australian Republican Movement from 2004 to 2007. She was manager of the Tasmanian Government arts unit, arts@work, before being pre-selected by the Australian Labor Party for a House of Assembly seat.

Election to Tasmanian Parliament
Singh was elected to the House of Assembly at the 2006 state election, as the member for Denison. In August 2007, she abstained from voting on a controversial bill supporting Gunns' Bell Bay Pulp Mill, after having failed in an appeal to then-Premier Paul Lennon for a free vote on the matter.

Singh firstly became a parliamentary secretary in 2008. The she entered Cabinet as Minister for Corrections and Consumer Protection, Minister for Workplace Relations, and Minister Assisting the Premier on Climate Change. She was sworn in at a ceremony at Government House on 26 November 2008. As minister, Singh introduced legislative reforms in workers compensation, corrections, climate change and asbestos management.

Singh was defeated at the 2010 state election. Following that, she co-founded the Asbestos Free Tasmania Foundation, an advocacy group to highlight the dangers of asbestos and support sufferers of asbestos-related disease, and became its first CEO.

Election to Australian Parliament
Singh was elected to the Australian Senate in the August 2010 federal election, making her the first person of South Asian descent to be elected to the Australian Parliament. On 18 October 2013, she was promoted to the position of shadow parliamentary secretary to the shadow Attorney-General. On 24 June 2014, the federal Labor leader, Bill Shorten, promoted her to the position of shadow parliamentary secretary for the Environment, Climate Change and Water.

In 2016, twelve senators were to be elected due to the double dissolution election, Singh's sixth position on the ticket was described in some media reports as "unwinnable". Following a campaign to vote for Singh "below the line" on the ballot paper, she received 20,741 votes, 80% of a quota, which was enough to overturn the party's ticket order and she was elected as the 10th senator elected for Tasmania.

Singh was defeated at the 2019 federal election after being again placed in the "unwinnable" fourth position on Labor's Tasmanian Senate ticket. Once again there was a campaign for people to support her by voting below the line. She polled 5.9% of the vote, or 0.4 quotas, only slightly fewer than her vote in 2016, but that was not enough, given the higher quota required at a half-Senate election.

Policy positions and achievements

Singh’s parliamentary career and advocacy focused on the promotion and protection of human rights, foreign affairs, trade and international development, multiculturalism and refugees, the environment and climate change, governance and access to justice. She has been a strong advocate for building the Australia-India relationship. In 2014, the President of India awarded her one of India’s highest civilian awards, the Pravasi Bharatiya Samman, for her exceptional and meritorious public service as a person of Indian heritage in fostering friendly relations between India and Australia.

In 2016, Singh represented Australia at the United Nations General Assembly, New York, as a parliamentary delegate of the Australian mission to the United Nations.

Other achievements included initiating, coordinating and completing inquiries and policy into banning Australia’s domestic trade in elephant ivory and rhinoceros horn, recommending the trade be outlawed; and undertaking an inquiry into human trafficking, slavery and slavery-like practices, and developing policy on modern slavery which contributed to the adoption of Australia’s first Modern Slavery Act.

Some of Singh’s parliamentary committee work included the Joint Standing Committee on Foreign Affairs, Defence and Trade, and the Joint Committee on Law Enforcement as its Deputy Chair and Privileges Committee.

As Co-Chair of the Parliamentary Friendship Group for UNICEF, in 2018 Singh led a delegation to the Rohingya refugee camps in Bangladesh. As Co-Chair of the Parliamentary Group on HIV, Singh represented the Australian parliament at the 22nd International AIDS conference and paid tribute to the late Professor David Cooper AC.

Singh has been a vocal opponent of Australia’s offshore detention of asylum seekers. She broke with the Labor Party’s official position to call for an end to indefinite offshore detention on the ABC TV Q&A program. Singh has been invited to speak internationally on refugee policy including presenting at Harvard University’s Kennedy School. She was subsequently invited by Harvard to contribute a chapter on the challenges of upholding children’s rights in immigration policy in a Research Handbook on Child Migration.

Singh served as a Commonwealth Secretariat Observer of the 2019 Solomon Islands General Elections.

References

External links
Senate web page
Official website

1972 births
Living people
Australian Labor Party members of the Parliament of Australia
Members of the Australian Senate
Members of the Australian Senate for Tasmania
Women members of the Australian Senate
Members of the Tasmanian House of Assembly
University of Tasmania alumni
Australian geographers
Australian republicans
Australian people of Indo-Fijian descent
Australian people of English descent
21st-century Australian politicians
21st-century Australian women politicians
Women members of the Tasmanian House of Assembly
Recipients of Pravasi Bharatiya Samman
Macquarie University alumni